The Waipu Lagoons is a series of small coastal lagoons near the city of New Plymouth in the Taranaki Region of New Zealand. The lagoons plus surrounding wetlands totalling  are a local purpose conservation reserve owned by the New Plymouth District Council.

Bird species found at the reserve include:
 Australasian bittern (Botaurus poiciloptilus) – endangered
 Australian coot (Fulica atra australis)
 Grey teal (Anus gracilis)
 Pūkeko (Porphyrio porphyrio)

Raupo (Typha orientalis), flax (Phormium tenax), and bamboo spike-sedge (Eleocharis sphacelata) are the principal plant species.

References

Lagoons of New Zealand
Landforms of Taranaki
Protected areas of Taranaki